The South African Railways Class 1B 4-8-2 of 1904 was a steam locomotive from the pre-Union era in the Colony of Natal.

In 1904, the Natal Government Railways placed fifty Class B locomotives with a   Mastodon wheel arrangement in service. Of these, six were modified in 1906 to Altered Class B locomotives, the first tender engines in the world with a  Mountain wheel arrangement. In 1912, when these six engines were assimilated into the South African Railways, they were renumbered and designated Class 1B.

Manufacturer
At the time when D.A. Hendrie was appointed as the Locomotive Superintendent of the Natal Government Railways (NGR), it had a large fleet of tank locomotives with an inherent limited coal and water range. It was also often necessary to double- and even triple-head trains over the worst sections of the mainline with its steep 1 in 30 (3⅓%) gradients. Hendrie was therefore tasked to produce a locomotive of greater power and capable of longer distances without refuelling or rewatering. His resulting Hendrie B achieved this and fifty such locomotives were delivered from the North British Locomotive Company (NBL) in 1904.

Characteristics

The engines used saturated steam and had plate frames, Belpaire fireboxes, Walschaerts valve gear and "D" slide valves. While the boiler was not pitched very high, Hendrie had still managed to extend the firebox sideways over the trailing driving wheels, with the result that the grate was almost on a level with the bottom of the boiler shell. To prevent the fire from entering the lower row of tubes, Hendrie arranged a vertical firewall towards the front of the grate, which created a dry combustion chamber.

Modifications

The first Mountain
In 1906, six of these locomotives with numbers in the range from 319 to 324, were modified to a  wheel arrangement by adding a trailing bissel truck below the cab. The modification was deemed necessary to ensure extra smooth running while hauling fast passenger trains. This modification turned them into the NGR’s Altered Class B, the first  Mountain type tender locomotives in the world.

Steam reverser
Beginning in 1907, these locomotives were equipped with steam reversing gear, also designed by Hendrie. All Hendrie’s locomotives also came equipped with piston tail rods, but since they were difficult and costly to maintain, they were removed in 1925.

South African Railways
When the Union of South Africa was established on 31 May 1910, the three Colonial government railways (Cape Government Railways, NGR and Central South African Railways) were united under a single administration to control and administer the railways, ports and harbours of the Union. Although the South African Railways and Harbours came into existence in 1910, the actual classification and renumbering of all the rolling stock of the three constituent railways were only implemented with effect from 1 January 1912.

In 1912, these six Mountain types were renumbered in the range from 1440 to 1445 and designated Class 1B on the South African Railways (SAR).

Between 1926 and 1928, new locomotives replaced the SAR Class 1B on mainline passenger service in Natal. Their trailing bissel trucks were then removed and, since they were once again identical to their sister Class 1  Mastodon types, they were all reclassified to Class 1. Instead of replacing the cabside number plates upon reclassification, the "B" of "1B" was ground or milled off.

Service
In their later years, the locomotives were relegated to shunting, particularly working in Natal but also in Cape Town, Port Elizabeth, East London and in Transvaal. The last of the class was withdrawn in 1975. In industrial service, no. 1443 was still in service in 1984 as Gledhow Sugar Mill's no. 1, Chaka. The engine still survives and is owned by the North British Locomotive Preservation Group.

Works numbers and renumbering
The works numbers and renumbering of the Class 1B are listed in the table.

Preservation
One Class 1B has survived into preservation.

References

1200
1200
4-8-2 locomotives
2D1 locomotives
NBL locomotives
Cape gauge railway locomotives
Railway locomotives introduced in 1906
1906 in South Africa
Scrapped locomotives